Ana Inês Palma Capeta (born 22 December 1997) is a Portuguese footballer who plays for Sporting CP from the Campeonato Nacional Feminino and the Portugal women's national team.

Career
Capeta is a player from Sporting Clube de Portugal and has been capped for the Portugal national team, appearing for the team during the 2019 FIFA Women's World Cup qualifying cycle.

References

External links
 
 
 

1997 births
Living people
People from Beja, Portugal
Portuguese women's footballers
Portugal women's international footballers
Women's association football midfielders
Sporting CP (women's football) players
F.C. Famalicão (women) players
Atlético Ouriense players
PSV (women) players
Campeonato Nacional de Futebol Feminino players
Expatriate women's footballers in the Netherlands
Portuguese expatriate sportspeople in the Netherlands
Sportspeople from Beja District